Candelariella deppeanae is a species of lichen in the family Candelariaceae. Found in southwestern North America, it was formally described as a new species in 2007 by Swedish lichenologist Martin Westberg. Here, in an oak forest, it was found growing on a decorticated (barkless) part of alligator juniper (Juniperus deppeana). Most collections of the lichen are from the wood or trunks of this juniper plant; the species epithet deppeanae alludes to this close relationship.

The lichen has a greenish-yellow to yellow, granular to areolate thallus. It has also been collected in Texas, and from Chihuahua, Baja California Norte and Baja California Sur. The lichen grows mainly on wood and decorticated trunks, but has also been less frequently recorded growing on bark. Secondary chemicals that have been detected in Candelariella deppeanae (using high-performance liquid chromatography) include calycin, pulvic acid lactone, vulpinic acid, and pulvinic acid.

References

deppeanae
Lichen species
Lichens described in 2007
Lichens of the Southwestern United States
Lichens of the South-Central United States
Lichens of Mexico
Fungi without expected TNC conservation status